These notable programs were broadcast on the NBC Radio Network and its predecessor, the NBC Red Network.

The A&P Gypsies
A. L. Alexander's Goodwill Court
The Abbott and Costello Show
Abbott Mysteries
Abie's Irish Rose
The Adventures of Ellery Queen
The Adventures of Frank Merriwell
The Adventures of Maisie
The Adventures of Ozzie and Harriet
The Adventures of Philip Marlowe
The Adventures of Sam Spade
The Adventures of the Thin Man
Against the Storm
The Al Pearce Show
The Alan Young Show
The Aldrich Family
The Amazing Mr. Malone
America Dances
The American Album of Familiar Music
The American Forum of the Air
American Portraits
Arch Oboler's Plays
Archie Andrews
Arco Birthday Party
The Army Hour
The Atwater Kent Hour
Aunt Mary
Author's Playhouse
The Baby Snooks Show
Bachelor's Children
Backstage Wife
Barrie Craig, Confidential Investigator
Battle of the Sexes
Beat the Band
The Bell Telephone Hour
The Bickersons
The Big Show
The Big Story
Big Town
Billy and Betty
Blondie
Bob and Ray
The Bob Crosby Show
Boston Blackie
Break the Bank
Breakfast in Hollywood
The Brighter Day
Bring 'Em Back Alive
Burns and Allen
Camel Caravan
Campus Revue
Can You Top This?
Candy Matson
The Capitol Theatre Family Show
The Carnation Contented Hour
Cavalcade of America
The Charlotte Greenwood Show
The Chase and Sanborn Hour
The Chesterfield Supper Club
Cities Service Concerts
Clara, Lu, and Em
The Clicquot Club Eskimos
Cloak and Dagger
The Colgate Sports Newsreel
Dan Harding's Wife
Dark Fantasy
A Date with Judy
Death Valley Days
Dick Tracy
Dimension X
Dr. I.Q.
Dr. Sixgun
The Dodge Victory Hour
Dragnet
The Dreft Star Playhouse
Drene Time
Duffy's Tavern
Easy Aces
The Eddie Cantor Show
The Eternal Light
The Eveready Hour
Everyman's Theater
The Falcon
Father Knows Best
Fibber McGee and Molly
The Fifth Horseman
The First Nighter Program
The Fleischmann's Yeast Hour
The Fred Allen Show
Ford Theatre
Four Star Playhouse
The Frank Sinatra Show
Gasoline Alley
The General Electric Concert
Girl Alone
The Goldbergs
The Goodrich Silvertown Orchestra
Grand Central Station
Grand Ole Opry
The Great Gildersleeve
Great Moments in History
The Guiding Light
The Halls of Ivy
The Happiness Boys
Harvest of Stars
The High-Jinkers
Hollywood Playhouse
Hollywood Star Playhouse
The Hoover Sentinels
House of Myths
I Love a Mystery
Information Please
The Ipana Troubadors
It Pays to Be Ignorant
It's Higgins, Sir
Jack Armstrong, the All-American Boy
The Jack Benny Program
Judy and Jane
The Judy Canova Show
The Jumbo Fire Chief Program
Just Plain Bill
Kraft Music Hall
Laundryland Lyrics
Let's Dance
Li'l Abner
Life Can Be Beautiful
The Life of Riley
Lights Out
Little Orphan Annie
Lonely Women
Lorenzo Jones
Lum and Abner
Lux Radio Theatre
Lyric Famous Challengers
Ma Perkins
Major Bowes Amateur Hour
The Man Called X
Manhattan Merry-Go-Round
The March of Time
The Marriage
The Martin and Lewis Show
Martin Kane, Private Eye
Maxwell House Show Boat
Mayor of the Town
Meet Corliss Archer
Meet the Press
The Mickey Mouse Theater of the Air
Monitor
Mr. and Mrs. North
Mr. District Attorney
Mr. I. A. Moto
Mr. Keen, Tracer of Lost Persons
Mystery House
Name That Tune
National Barn Dance
NBC Presents: Short Story
NBC University Theatre
The New Adventures of Nero Wolfe
Night Beat
The O'Neills
Old Gold on Broadway
One Man's Family
Palmolive Beauty Box Theater
The Palmolive Hour
The Parade of States
The Passing Parade
People are Funny
Pepper Young's Family
Pete Kelly's Blues
The Phil Harris-Alice Faye Show
Philo Vance
Portia Faces Life
Pot o' Gold
Quiz Kids
The Railroad Hour
The Red Skelton Show
Reg'lar Fellers
Richard Diamond, Private Detective
Ripley's Believe It or Not!
Rising Musical Stars
Rocky Fortune
Rosemary
The Roy Rogers Show
The Saint
Screen Directors Playhouse
The Screen Guild Theater
Second Husband
Shell Chateau
The Six Shooter
Smackout
Snow Village Sketches
The Spike Jones Show
The Standard Hour
The Standard School Broadcast
Stella Dallas
Stop Me If You've Heard This One
Strike It Rich
Stroke of Fate
Tales of the Texas Rangers
Terry and the Pirates
This Is Your Life
Today's Children
Tommy Riggs and Betty Lou
Truth or Consequences
Uncle Walter's Doghouse
The United States Steel Hour
Vic and Sade
The Vikings
The Voice of Firestone
Vox Pop
We Hold These Truths
What's My Name?
When a Girl Marries
The Whisperer
Who Said That?
The World Is Yours
X Minus One
You Bet Your Life
Young Widder Brown
Your Family and Mine
Your Hit Parade

References

Lists of radio programs